Clarion Fracture Zone is an Australian contemporary jazz ensemble. Their debut album Blue Shift (1990), released through ABC Records, won the 1991 ARIA Award for Best Jazz Album. It was recorded by the line-up of Sandy Evans on tenor and soprano saxophones; Tony Gorman on alto and tenor saxophones, clarinet and percussion; Alister Spence on piano and keyboards; Steve Elphick on bass guitar; Andrew Dickeson on drums and percussion. They were also nominated in the same category in 1997 for their fourth album, Less Stable Elements (1996).

Members

Sandy Evans : saxophones (tenor, soprano)
Tony Gorman : saxophones (alto, tenor), clarinet
Alister Spence : piano, keyboards
Lloyd Swanton: double bass
Toby Hall: drums

Former
Steve Elphick : bass
Andrew Dickeson  : drums
Louis Burdett : drums
Tony Buck : drums

Discography

Albums

Awards

ARIA Music Awards
The ARIA Music Awards is an annual awards ceremony that recognises excellence, innovation, and achievement across all genres of Australian music. They commenced in 1987. 

! 
|-
| 1991
| Blue Shift
| Best Jazz Album
| 
| 
|-
| 1997
| Less Stable Elements
| Best Jazz Album
| 
| 
|-

References

External links
Clarion Fracture Zone | Sandy Evans
Clarion Fracture Zone : programs and related material collected by the National Library of Australia

New South Wales musical groups
ARIA Award winners